Red is the fourth studio album by British pop-rock group T'Pau, which was released by Gnatfish in 1998. As the first T'Pau album since 1991's The Promise, Red features singer Carol Decker as the only member from the original line-up.

Background
In the years after T'Pau's split in 1992, Decker continued to occasionally perform as a solo artist. In 1997, after finding new management, she formed a new line-up of T'Pau in order to begin touring again. As the only original member, Decker originally considered touring under her own name, but was advised that using the T'Pau name would generate more recognition. That year, the band undertook a 25-date UK tour and also released a new version of the band's 1986 hit "Heart and Soul" as "Heart and Soul '97". Decker recorded Red between December 1997 to July 1998 at Roundhouse Studios in London. The album, which was released in September 1998, was supported by a thirty-six date tour named "The Red Tour". Further promotional activities included a live session for Virgin Radio and an appearance on VH1, which Decker also filmed material for in New York. Later in November and December 1998, T'Pau supported Status Quo on the German and UK leg of their Tour "It's Good to Tour". To promote the album, a radio promo single, "With a Little Luck", was released. Red was not a commercial success, nor was a re-recorded version of "Giving Up the Ghost", which was released in 1999.

In a 2011 interview with Old School - Back to the 80s, Decker spoke of the album, "I would've loved to have gotten the same level of success again [with Red]. It didn't happen although I did sell a lot of albums on the road." Speaking to Super Deluxe Edition in 2013, she added, "I recorded Red when I was pregnant with my daughter. I toured it up and down the UK, and then I went across Europe with Status Quo and I left her behind when she was six months old. I sulked my way across Germany – it was just awful. I hadn't been a mum before. I left her safe and sound and well sorted, but I didn't take into consideration being a new mother, separated from her daughter after six months, with hormones raging... I was in bits."

Release
Red was released in September 1998 in the UK by Decker's own label Gnatfish. It was given a release in the United States on 9 November 1999 by Renaissance Records as a two-disc set, with the additional disc containing three tracks: the re-recorded "Heart and Soul '97", a live, unplugged version of the band's 1987 UK number one hit "China in Your Hand", and the demo version of the album track "Do the Right Dance".

Critical reception

On its release, Dave Ling of Classic Rock wrote, "Sonically, T'Pau still favour smooth, occasionally faceless walls of melody best exemplified on 'Now That You're Gone' and 'Make Love to Me'. Could have lived without the Big Country flavoured 'Do the Right Dance'; and surely Paul McCartney will be suing Decker for re-writing Wings' 'With a Little Luck' and re-titling it 'Wing and a Prayer'? Nevertheless, this is a solid enough comeback album." Heather Phares of AllMusic stated, "The group's smooth pop sounds remain intact on songs like 'With a Little Luck,' 'Now That You're Gone,' 'Giving Up the Ghost,' and 'Let It All Fall.'

Track listing

Personnel
 Carol Decker – vocals
 Jez Ashurst – electric guitar, acoustic guitar
 Scott Taylor – guitar (tracks 2, 6-7)
 Spencer Cozens – keyboards (tracks 2, 4-7, 10)
 Kat Evans – fiddle (track 3)
 Dan McKinna – bass
 Dave Hattee – drums, programming on "Love Song"
 Ray Weston – drums (tracks 3, 9)

Production
 Carol Decker – producer (all tracks)
 Rafe McKenna - producer (tracks 1, 3, 8–9), mixing, engineer
 Marco Sabiu - producer (track 1), programming (track 1)
 Ronnie Rogers - producer (tracks 3, 9)
 Simon Dawson, Feddy de Faye, Alan Jenkins, Roberto Pieroni – engineers
 Jeremy Gill, Simon Morris, Peter Sberi – assistant engineers
 Robin – mastering

Other
 Tom Howard – main photography
 Patricia O'Niell – make up
 Deluxe – design
 Wye Media – artwork

References

1998 albums
T'Pau (band) albums